Jennifer B. H. Martiny is an American ecologist who is a professor at the University of California, Irvine. Her research considers microbial diversity in marine and terrestrial ecosystems. In 2020 she was elected a Fellow of the American Association for the Advancement of Science.

Early life and education 
Martiny was an undergraduate studied at the University of California, San Diego. It was here that she first became interested in ecology. During a study abroad programme in Costa Rica, Martiny started working on tropical ecology. After graduating with her bachelor's degree, Martiny studied the diversity of birds and butterflies with Gretchen Daily. She joined Stanford University as a graduate student, where she was introduced to microbes. Her doctoral research considered the distribution and loss of biodiversity. Martiny stayed at Stanford as a postdoctoral fellow, where she started working on the microorganisms.

Research and career 
Martiny studies microbial ecosystems, both on earth and at sea. She focusses on the mechanisms that regulate microbial diversity, and how this diversity impacts the function of ecosystems. In particular, Martiny studies ocean viruses. She started her independent scientific career at Brown University, where she established her own laboratory in 2000. Here she studied the composition of bacterial assemblages and how this composition impacted the function of ecosystems. At Brown she developed new techniques to study bacterial communities in the field; including DNA sequencing. In particular, Martiny focussed on the bacterial diversity in salt marshes, and how these bacterial communities responded to changes in ecosystems. The salt marshes evaluated by Martiny included coastal marshes, which act as filters between open water and the pollutants from fisheries and nearby societies.

In 2006 Martiny moved to the University of California, Irvine (UCI). Martiny serves as Director of the UCI Microbiome Initiative. She has investigated the impact of drought on the microbial diversity of soil. By studying the soil found in Orange County parklands, Martiny showed that moisture depravation can result in changes in the representation of bacteria and fungi. The reasons for these changes in composition are unclear, and may be that microorganisms that are unfit of dry conditions might mutate. To perform these experiments, Martiny and Kathleen Treseder devised a technique called microbial caging. In this approach, dead plant material is encapsulated with microbes in a nylon membrane and measurements are recorded at regular intervals. She was announced as a Visiting Professor at the Technical University of Denmark in 2020.

Awards and honours 

 2005 Gordon and Betty Moore Foundation
 2011 National Academy of Sciences Kavli Frontiers of Science Fellow
 2012 VELUX Visiting Professor to Copenhagen University
 2017 Elected Fellow of the Ecological Society of America
 2017 Elected Fellow of the American Society for Microbiology
 2017 University of California, Irvine Chancellor's Fellow
 2020 Elected Fellow of the American Association for the Advancement of Science

Selected publications

References

External links 
UCI Dean's Distinguished Lecture Series - Dr. Jennifer Martiny

Fellows of the American Association for the Advancement of Science
University of California, San Diego alumni
University of California, Irvine faculty
Stanford University alumni
Brown University alumni
Microbiologists
Fellows of the Ecological Society of America
Year of birth missing (living people)
Living people